Pytalovo (or  is a town and the administrative center of Pytalovsky District in Pskov Oblast, Russia, located on the Utroya River (a tributary of the Velikaya),  southwest of Pskov, the administrative center of the oblast. Population: 

It was previously known as Pytalovo or Novo-Dmitrovskoye (until 1925), Jaunlatgale (until 1938), Abrene (until 1945).

Etymology
Accounts of the origin of Pytalovo's name reflect the region's dichotomy. The unofficial Pytalovo website offers two theories about the origin of the town's name. One is that it was named after Lieutenant Pytalov, a guard to Catherine the Great, who received the lands in 1766 for reasons unknown, that estate subsequently being sold off by his descendants. The other is that the name is derived from the Russian verb "" (meaning "to torture"), named after a church courtyard with a large iron cross used to torture and execute people.

Another theory is that Pytalovo is Russified form of the Latvian toponym "Pietālava" (Latvian "pie Tālavas", or Latgalian "pī Tuolavas"), meaning "near Tālava", with Tālava being the name of an ancient Latvian feudal state. Russophones comprised the majority of the population in a number of parishes during Latvia's initial independence, with further Russification ongoing. But now, as the older generation passes on, children are being educated in Russian schools as Russians even under Latvia".</ref> Historian Carl von Stern wrote of a cultural awakening amongst the region's inhabitants in the 1930s despite generations of Russification. Two thousand inhabitants from across Pskov gathered in September 1934 and proclaimed: "We are not Russian, but, indeed, Latvian. We are returning to our Latvian heritage. Latvians, lend us your helping hand, support and hasten our return!" Audiences wept as they heard old familiar folk songs sung with words and a language lost over time. A more concrete testament to Pytalovo's Latvian heritage is that the Latvian folk costumes of the region are the only ones which still preserve the most ancient tradition of white dress, once used in both daily life and for festive occasions.

History

Pytalovo, alternatively known as Novo-Dmitrovskoye, a rural locality in Vyshgorodok volost, Ostrovsky Uyezd, Pskov Governorate, had been known since the end of the 18th century. In the last quarter of the 19th century, it had a population of 59. It grew significantly after gaining a railway station by a newly constructed railway branch.

In February 1918 the German Army advances on Pskov and Petrograd capturing Pytalovo until fall 1918, when the Red Army retakes it. In May 1919 г. advancing pro-czarist Russian North-Western Army of Gen. Nikolai Yudenich supported by Estonian and Latvian republican units recaptures westernmost part of the Pskov Governorate. The frontline as of noon the 1st of February 1920 was stipulated as the border demarcation line by the Latvian–Soviet Peace Treaty of 1920 between Latvian Republic and Russian Soviet Federative Socialist Republic.

By the Latvian–Soviet Peace Treaty of 1920, a part of Ostrovsky Uyezd, including Pytalovo, was passed to Latvia. In 1925, Latvians renamed it Jaunlatgale, which it was known as until 1938, when the name was changed to Abrene. In 1933, it was granted town status. During the interwar period, it was the administrative center of Abrene District. After the annexation of Latvia by the Soviet Union in 1940, the town originally remained a part of the Latvian SSR. During World War II, the town was occupied by the German Army from July 5, 1941 until July 22, 1944 and administered as part of the Generalbezirk Lettland of Reichskommissariat Ostland. On January 16, 1945, the town and the surrounding areas were transferred to Pskov Oblast of the Russian SFSR and Pytalovsky District was established. At the same time, the town's original name (Pytalovo) was restored.

Whether the region is historically Russian or Latvian became a highly politicized issue after Latvia restored its independence in 1991 and a border dispute erupted with Russia over the region. The Abrene District, constituting roughly 2% of Latvia's territory, was transferred to the Russian SFSR in 1945, but it had originally been a part of Russia and ceded to Latvia only a quarter century earlier, in 1920. Russian President Vladimir Putin infamously proclaimed in 2005 that Latvia "will get the ears of a dead donkey but not Pytalovo [Abrene]". The border dispute was not resolved until 2007, when a treaty between Latvia and Russia recognizing the existing border was signed.

Administrative and municipal status
Within the framework of administrative divisions, Pytalovo serves as the administrative center of Pytalovsky District, to which it is directly subordinated. As a municipal division, the town of Pytalovo is incorporated within Pytalovsky Municipal District as Pytalovo Urban Settlement.

Economy
Industry
As of 2003, only two industrial enterprises survived in Pytalovo—a textile factory and a printing house. A milk factory and a flax production factory, previously the biggest enterprises in the district, were defunct.

Transportation

Pytalovo is an important railway station on the railway from St. Petersburg via Pskov to Rēzekne in Latvia and further to Vilnius. In Pytalovo, another railway to Gulbene and Riga branches off west. As of 2012, there was passenger traffic on the railway.

Pytalovo has an easy access to the European route E262, from Ostrov to Kaunas via Rēzekne and Daugavpils.

Culture
Among places of interest in town Pytalovo there is a railway station building built in the modernist style in the early 20th century, the wooden building of the functioning St. Nicholas Church built in 1931, the post office building (early 20th century), and the house of merchant Ilyin (built in the 1920s).

Pytalovo is home to an ethnographic museum focusing on Russian and Latgalian cultures.

References

Sources
 
 
 Архивный отдел Псковского облисполкома. Государственный архив Псковской области. "Административно-территориальное деление Псковской области (1917–1988 гг.). Справочник". (Administrative-Territorial Structure of Pskov Oblast (1917–1988). Reference.'') Книга I. Лениздат, 1988

External links
  Unofficial website of Pytalovo
  Izvestya article about reaction of local inhabitants in 2005

Cities and towns in Pskov Oblast
Latvia–Russia relations
Geographic history of Latvia
Ostrovsky Uyezd